Iragavaram Mandal is one of the 46 mandals in the West Godavari district of the Indian state of Andhra Pradesh. The headquarters are located at Iragavaram town. The mandal is bordered by Peravali mandal and Penugonda mandal to the north, Penumantra mandal to the east, Attili mandal to the south, and Tanuku mandal to the west.

Demographics 
As of the 2011 census, the mandal had a population of 65,831 in 19,482 households. The total population included 33,202 males and 32,629 females with a sex ratio of 983 females per 1000 males. There were 6,283 children in the age group of 0–6 years, of which 3,205 were boys and 3,078 were girls with a sex ratio of 960. The average literacy rate stood at 77.39% (46,084) of which 24,341 were male and 21,743 were female. There were 11,586 people from a Scheduled Caste and 485 from a Scheduled Tribe.

Employment
As per the report published by Census India in 2011, the unemployment rate was 56%, with only 28,956 people (44%) of the Iragavaram Mandal total population employed. The employment ratio by gender is  roughly 70/30 male/female (20,631 males and 8,325 females). According to the census, 24,751 workers had worked for at least six months out of the last year; of these, 3,260 worked as cultivators, 15,438 as agricultural labourers, 461 in household industry, and 5,592 in other work. There were also 4,205 workers who worked for three to six months out of the preceding year.

Administration 
Iragavaram mandal is administered under the Tanuku assembly constituency of Narsapuram and is one of the twelve mandals in the Narasapuram revenue division.

Towns and villages 
According to the 2011 census, the mandal has 21 settlements, all of which are villages. Iragavaram is the largest and Garuvuguntakhandrika is the smallest in population.

The settlements in the mandal are:

Education 
The Mandal plays a major role in education for the rural students of the nearby villages. Primary and secondary school education is imparted by the government, aided by private schools, under the School Education Department of the state. As of the 2015–16 academic year, the mandal had more than 6,167 students enrolled in over 70 schools.

See also 
 List of mandals in Andhra Pradesh
 Eluru

References

 Mandals in West Godavari district